Charles Gray may refer to:

 Charles Gray (Colchester MP) (1696–1782), Member of Parliament for Colchester, 1742–1755, 1761–1780
 Charles Gray (songwriter) (1782–1851), Royal Marines captain and songwriter
 Charles McNeill Gray (1807–1885), American politician, Mayor of Chicago, 1853–1854
 Charles Gray (artist) (1816–1905), Scottish artist who worked in Australia
 Charles Wing Gray (1845–1920), British Member of Parliament for Maldon, 1886–1892
 Charles Gray (New Zealand politician) (1853–1918), Member of Parliament for Christchurch North, 1905–1908
 Charles Gray (Canadian politician) (1879–1954), Mayor of Winnipeg, 1919–1920
 Charles H. Gray (1921–2008), American actor
 Charles Gray (actor) (1928–2000), British actor
 Sir Charles Gray (Scottish politician) (1929–2023), Scottish local politician and leader of Strathclyde Regional Council, 1986–1992
 Sir Charles Gray (judge) (1942–2022), English High Court judge
 Charles Gray (diplomat) (born 1953), former British Ambassador to Morocco and HM Marshal of the Diplomatic Corps
 Chuck Gray (Arizona politician) (born 1958), former Arizonan state senator and member of the Arizona House of Representative
 Charles Gray (musician), also known as Ultra Kyu, American former member of The Aquabats

See also
 Charles Grey (disambiguation)